This is a list of notable Puerto Ricans of significant African ancestry, which represents a significant portion of the Puerto Rican population. It includes people born in or living in the mainland United States. This list contains the names of persons who meet the Notability criteria, even if the person does not have an article yet. Additions to the list must be listed in alphabetical order by surname.

Each addition to the list must also provide a reliable verifiable source which cites the person's notability and/or the person's link to Puerto Rico, otherwise the name will be removed.

List 

Randy Ariel Ortiz Acevedo - reggaetón artist, member of the duo "Jowell y Randy"
David Luciano Acosta - reggaetón artist, known as "Baby Ranks"
Ángel Aguilar - rapper
Carlos Alomar - guitarist
Cayetano "Tite" Curet Alonso - composer of over 2,000 "salsa" songs
Alani "La La" Anthony - entertainer and actress, MTV VJ
 Heliot Ramos
 Henry Ramos
 Kellyn Acosta
Carmelo Anthony - professional basketball player, who is currently a Free agent
Rick Avilés - actor and comedian 
Lloyd Banks - rapper
Dr. José Celso Barbosa - medical physician, sociologist, and political leader of Puerto Rico, statehood advocate, first Puerto Rican with a US medical degree
Dr. Pilar Barbosa - educator, historian and political activist
 Jean-Michel Basquiat - artist 
Pura Belpré - first Puerto Rican librarian in New York City
Wilfred Benítez - boxer; won world championships in three separate weight divisions; youngest world champion in boxing history
Ángela Bofill - jazz and R&B singer
Juan Boria - poet, writer of the Afro-Caribbean genre of poetry
Víctor Cabrera - reggaetón artist and producer, member of the duo "Luny Tunes"
Iván M. Calderón - boxer
Iván P. Calderón - Major League Baseball player
Tego Calderón - reggaetón artist
Jasmine Camacho-Quinn - 110-meter hurdles record holder and Olympic gold medallist
José Campeche - Puerto Rican rococo artist
Dr. Pedro Albizu Campos - politician and former leader of the Nationalist Party of Puerto Rico, which advocated for independence
Juan Morel Campos - composer of danza
Dr. José Ferrer Canales - educator, writer, pro-independence political activist
Maidel Amador Canales - Spanish reggae artist, known as "La Sista"
Irene Cara - singer and actress
Ashley Ann Cariño - second black woman to compete in Miss Universe beauty pageant as Miss Puerto Rico 
Orlando "Peruchín" Cepeda - baseball player, inducted into the National Baseball Hall of Fame by the Veterans Committee
Pedro "Perucho" Cepeda - baseball player, father of Orlando, considered one of the greatest players of his generation
Rafael Cepeda - folk musician and composer; patriarch of the Cepeda family; Afro–Puerto Rican folk music, especially bomba. Related to Pedro and Orlando Cepeda
Nero Chen - professional boxer
Roberto Clemente Walker - baseball player, first Latin American to be selected and the only current Hall of Famer for whom the mandatory five-year waiting period was waived
Roberto Clemente, Jr. - baseball broadcaster and former baseball player. 
Carlitos Colón -  former WWE wrestler
Carly Colón - WWE wrestler; son of Carlitos Colon
Jesús Colón - writer and politician, known as the "father of the Nuyorican Movement"
Michelle Marie Colón - first black woman to compete in Miss Universe beauty pageant as Miss Puerto Rico 
Celestina Cordero - educator, established the first school for girls in San Juan
Rafael Cordero - known as the "father of public education in Puerto Rico"; self-educated man who provided free schooling to children regardless of race. Brother of Celestina Cordero
Ismael Cruz Córdova - actor, played Mando on Sesame Street
Maritza Correia - first Afro–Puerto Rican to be on the USA Olympic swimming team; first black US swimmer to set an American and world swimming record
Rafael Cortijo - percussionist, bandleader, plena artist, and composer
Eva Cruz - volleyball player
Víctor Cruz - NFL wide receiver for New York Giants
Wilson Cruz - actor and advocate for gay youth of color 
Javier Culson - track and field runner, Olympic bronze medalist who specializes in the 400 metre hurdles
Eddie Dee - reggaetón artist
Carlos Delgado - baseball player, Major League Baseball first baseman
Rubén Díaz, Jr. - politician, current NYC borough president for the Bronx
Rubén Díaz, Sr. - politician
Shabba Doo - dancer
Thomas Dulorme - professional boxer
Nino Escalera - baseball player, first Hispanic in the Reds franchise
Ángel Espada - boxer; the WBA's world Welterweight champion in 1975-76
Jaime Espinal - professional wrestler
Lucy Fabery - jazz singer, known as "La Muñeca de Chocolate"
Antonio Fargas - actor, known for his roles in 1970s blaxploitation movies
José "Cheo" Feliciano - New York-based composer and singer of "salsa" and bolero music
Ruth Fernández - singer and actress; first Latina singer of romantic music to sing in the Scandinavian countries; first Latina to record with a North American band
Pedro Flores - composer of ballads and boleros
Kevin Gates - rapper
Rubén Gómez - Major League Baseball right-handed starting pitcher; first Puerto Rican to pitch in a World Series game
Reagan Gómez-Preston - actress
Herbert Lewis Hardwick, aka "Cocoa Kid" - boxer; won the world colored welterweight and world colored middleweight championships; inducted into the International Boxing Hall of Fame in 2012
 Edward W. Hardy - composer, violinist, violist, producer, and actor, known for his off-Broadway musical The Woodsman
Yvonne Harrison - track and field runner
Juano Hernández - actor; first Afro–Puerto Rican to become a major star in the US and among the "new style" black screen actors, who played straight dramatic roles
Keylla Hernandéz - television reporter, former co-anchor of the station's morning news show ″Noticentro al Amanecer″
Rafael Hernández Marín - musician, bandleader, and composer; wrote, among thousands of other songs, Lamento Borincano
Aideliz Hidalgo - first black woman to compete in Miss International beauty pageant as Miss Puerto Rico
Homicide - professional wrestler formerly for TNA.
Rafael Ithier - "salsa" musician and the principal founder of the highly successful orchestra El Gran Combo
Reginald Martínez Jackson - Hall of Fame baseball player, known as "Mr. October"
Esteban De Jesús - boxer, first to defeat Roberto Durán
Miriam Jiménez Román
Rafael José - actor, singer, television host
Erick Kolthoff - Associate Justice of the Supreme Court of Puerto Rico
Tato Laviera - poet
Benjamín LaGuer - US soldier and convicted criminal
Enrique A. Laguerre - novelist and newspaper columnist; "La llamarada" is considered to be his most important novel
Alfred Lee - basketball player, first Puerto Rican to play in NBA and to win an NBA championship as a member of the 79-80 Los Angeles Lakers
Isabel la Negra - known as "la Negra"; madame of a brothel
Felipe Luciano - poet, radio personality, and pro-independence activist
Young M.A - American hip hop artist 
Eddie Manso - politician, current mayor of Loíza and member of the New Progressive Party of Puerto Rico
Sonia Manzano - actress
Alpo Martínez - convicted criminal, previously known as "Mayor of Harlem"
Syesha Mercado - singer
Rogelio Mills - television host
Jerome Mincy - basketball player
Rico Nasty - rapper
Emilio "Millito" Navarro - baseball player; first Puerto Rican to play baseball in the Negro leagues
Don Omar - reggaetón artist
Fres Oquendo - professional heavyweight boxer
Anita Ortega - former athlete; UCLA, LAPD, Western States Police and Fire Games and Los Angeles City Section Halls of Fame
Claudette Ortiz - model and R&B singer
Edwin Pellot - retired basketball player
Víctor Pellot - baseball player; second black Puerto Rican to play in Major League Baseball; first Puerto Rican to play in the American League
Willie Perdomo - poet, writer
Miguel José Pérez Sr. - former wrestler, best known for 1/2 of the Tag Team with Antonio Rocca and World Wrestling Council
Miguel José Pérez Jr. - current WWE wrestler, son of Miguel José Pérez Sr.
Gabriel "Lennox" Pizarro - reggaetón artist, member of the duo 'Zion y Lennox'
Adolfo Quiñones - actor, dancer, and choreographer
Ivy Queen - reggaetón artist
Adolfo "OG Black" Ramírez - reggaetón artist, member of the duo "Master Joe & OG Black"
Ernesto Ramos Antonini - President of the House of Representatives of Puerto Rico and co-founder of the "Partido Popular Democrático de Puerto Rico" (Popular Democratic Party of Puerto Rico)
Gina Ravera - actress
Carmen Belén Richardson - actress and comedian; pioneer of Puerto Rican television
Vanessa del Río - adult film actress
Ismael Rivera - "salsa" artist and singer
Lance Rivera - film director, film producer and record executive 
Naya Rivera - singer and actress
Victor Rivera -wrestler
Aida Rodriguez - comedian, actress
Johnny Rodriguez - wrestler 
Pedro Rosa Nales - journalist, news anchor/reporter; has received over 200 awards
Zoé Saldaña - actress
O. J. Santiago - NFL football player, tight end
Víctor Santiago, Jr. - rapper, known by the stage name "N.O.R.E."
Rubén Santiago-Hudson - actor and playwright, born and residing in the US
Mayra Santos-Febres - writer, poet, essayist, screenwriter, and college professor
Arturo Alfonso Schomburg - historian, writer and pro-Puerto Rican independence activist in New York City; researched and raised awareness of Afro-Latin American and African American history and contributions
Rafael "Lito" Sierra - reggaetón artist, member of duo "Lito y Polaco"
Rubén Sierra - former Major League Baseball player
Pedro Telemaco - first black actor featured as leading man in a Puerto Rican telenovela
Piri Thomas - writer, author of Down These Mean Streets
Georgie Torres - basketball player, played for the BSN league of Puerto Rico; holds scoring record
José "Chegüi" Torres - boxer, light heavyweight champion; inducted into the Boxing Hall of Fame
Félix Trinidad - professional boxer, world boxing champion
Marcelo Trujillo - politician, current mayor of Humacao and member of the Popular Democratic Party of Puerto Rico
Daniel "Divino" Velázquez - reggaetón artist
Joseph Vásquez - independent filmmaker
Lauren Vélez - actress
Loraine Vélez - actress
Juan Evangelista Venegas - boxer; first Puerto Rican to win an Olympic medal
Christina Vidal - actress
Lisa Vidal - actress
Tanya Vidal - actress
Sylvia del Villard - actress, dancer, choreographer and political activist
Otilio "Bizcocho" Warrington - comedian and actor, best known for roles of "Bizcocho" and "Cuca Gómez"
Bernie Williams - former Major League Baseball outfielder; professional jazz musician
Marcos Xiorro - slave; in 1821, planned and conspired to lead a slave revolt against the sugar plantation owners and the Spanish Colonial government in Puerto Rico
Pedro Zayas - rapper and former member of State Property, known as "Peedi Crakk"
 Neil Degrasse Tyson - astrophysicist
 Victor Rivera - wrestler
 Brandon Servania - soccer player
 Héctor Ramos
 Jan Mateo
 Ryan López
 Ray Toro

See also

List of Puerto Ricans
Afro-Latin American - Central and South America
Black Hispanic and Latino Americans - United States of America
List of topics related to Black and African people

References

Afro–Puerto Rican
Lists of people from Puerto Rico
Lists of people by ethnicity